Estadio Centenario is a multi-use stadium in Resistencia, Argentina. It is used mostly for football matches, but also for rugby union, and hosts the homes matches of Sarmiento de Resistencia. The stadium was designed with a capacity of 25,000 spectators.

In 2013, it was announced that Argentina would play the opening game of their 2014 Season at the Estadio Centenario. The game would be the first of their two Admiral Brown Cup games against Ireland.

References 

Football venues in Argentina
Resistencia, Chaco
Sarmiento de Resistencia